Ahuacatlán Municipality may refer to:

Ahuacatlán Municipality, Nayarit
Ahuacatlán Municipality, Puebla

See also
Ahuacatlán (disambiguation)

Municipality name disambiguation pages